Lutter is a municipality in the district of Eichsfeld in Thuringia, Germany.

References

External links
Meinestadt on Lutter

Eichsfeld (district)